Sidney Albert von Luther (May 5, 1925 – August 15, 1985) was an American politician from New York.

Life
He was born on May 5, 1925, in Charlotte Amalie, on Saint Thomas, in the U.S. Virgin Islands, the son of Carl von Luther. He attended Columbia University, the University of Maryland and the London School of Economics. He served as a hospitalman apprentice in the U.S. Navy. He married Margaret Strakey, and they had one son.

He became active in union and civil rights matters in Harlem.  He also entered politics as a Democrat, and was a member of the New York State Senate from 1971 to 1974, sitting in the 179th and 180th New York State Legislatures.

He died on August 15, 1985, at his home in Manhattan; and was buried at the Calverton National Cemetery.

Further reading
Paterson, David "Black, Blind, & In Charge: A Story of Visionary Leadership and Overcoming Adversity."Skyhorse Publishing. New York, New York, 2020

References

1925 births
1985 deaths
People from Saint Thomas, U.S. Virgin Islands
Democratic Party New York (state) state senators
Burials at Calverton National Cemetery
People from Manhattan
African-American state legislators in New York (state)
20th-century American politicians
20th-century African-American politicians